Rudolph (Rollo) Robert Basil Aloysius Augustine Feilding, 9th Earl of Denbigh, 8th Earl of Desmond,  (26 May 1859 – 25 November 1939), styled Viscount Feilding from 1865 to 1892, was a British peer and officer.

Biography
Lord Feilding was the eldest son of the 8th Earl of Denbigh and Mary (née Berkeley). He succeeded his father as Earl of Denbigh in 1892.

He was an artillery lieutenant at the Battle of Tel el-Kebir, where he laid the horse artillery gun that hit the third railway train on the line there and prevented the further retreat of the Egyptians.

Lord Denbigh was Colonel commandant of the Honourable Artillery Company from 1903 until 1933.

In March 1902, Lord Denbigh was head of a mission sent by the British government to congratulate Pope Leo XIII upon entering on the 25th year of his Pontificate.

Personal life
On 24 September 1884, the then Viscount Fielding married Hon. Cecilia Mary Clifford (1860–1919), daughter of Charles Hugh Clifford, 8th Baron Clifford of Chudleigh and the Hon. Agnes Louisa Catherine (née Petre). They had three sons and seven daughters:

 Rudolph Edmund Aloysius Feilding, Viscount Feilding (12 October 1885 – 10 January 1937)
 Lt-Cmdr. Hon. Hugh Cecil Robert Feilding (30 December 1886 – 31 May 1916), killed at the Battle of Jutland
 Lady Mary Alice Clara Feilding (31 March 1888 – 1973), married Sir Cecil Dormer
 Lady Dorothie Mary Evelyn Feilding (6 October 1889 – 24 October 1935), married Capt. Charles O'Hara Moore and had issue
 Lady Agnes Mary Mabel Feilding (13 September 1891 – 31 August 1938), a nun
 Lady Marjorie Mary Winifrede Feilding (4 September 1892 – 1979), married first Capt. Edward Hanly in 1915 (divorced 1923), and second Capt. Robert Arthur Heath in 1923, with issue by both marriages
 Capt. Hon. Henry Simon Feilding (29 June 1894 – 9 October 1917), killed at the Battle of Passchendaele
 Lady Clare Mary Cecilia Feilding (23 November 1896 – 1966), married G/Capt. Joseph Smyth-Pigott and had issue
 Lady Elizabeth Mary Feilding (22 August 1899 – 19??), married Eric Sherbrooke Walker and had issue
 Lady Victoria Mary Dolores Feilding (29 March 1901 – 19??), married Walter Miles Fletcher and had issue

A widower, the Earl married, secondly, on 12 February 1923 to Kathleen Emmet (d. 13 February 1952), daughter of Dr. Thomas Addis Emmet, of New York City.

References

Sources

External links

 
|-

1859 births
1939 deaths
British Army personnel of the Anglo-Egyptian War
Conservative Party (UK) Baronesses- and Lords-in-Waiting
Knights Grand Cross of the Royal Victorian Order
Members of London County Council
Royal Horse Artillery officers
Rudolph
Earls of Denbigh
Desmond, Rudolph Feilding, 8th Earl of